Jane Ludlow Drake Abbott  (July 10, 1881 – December 13, 1962) was an American writer who published more than 35 books. She started writing children's books when her own children were small and later went on to write adult novels. Many of her books were written primarily for girls, but had broad appeal for the whole family.

Biography
Jane Ludlow Drake was born on July 10, 1881 in Buffalo, New York, to Captain Marcus Motier Drake and his second wife, Mary A. Ludlow. Her family was involved in shipbuilding and sailing, and Jane spent much of her childhood on and near the Great Lakes.  

She attended Cornell University from 1899-1902, working for two years as part of the editorial staff of the graduate newspaper.

On December 21, 1902, Jane married Frank Addison Abbott, a former Cornell student and lawyer from Buffalo who later served as District Attorney of Erie County (1906-1908). They had three children.

Jane Abbott began writing books for children, later writing fiction for adults. She published about twenty books for boys and girls, and about fifteen novels for adults. Many of her books were written primarily for girls, but had broad appeal, combining "fun, family life, adventure and mystery in just the right proportions". They were praised as being "natural",  "good, wholesome books", "brimming with life, but clean in their conception and their language".

Main works

 Keineth,  1918
 Larkspur, 1919
 Highacres,  1920
 Happy House, 1920
 Aprilly, 1921
 Red-Robin,  1922
 Fidelis, 1923
 Minglestreams,  1923
 Laughing Last, 1924
 Juliet Is Twenty,  1926
 Heyday,  1928
 Beggarman,  1930
 Merridy Road,  1930
 Kitty Frew,  1931
 Bouquet Hill,  1931
 The Young Dalfreys,  1932
 Silver Fountain,  1932
 Miss Jolley's Family,  1933
 Dicket: A Story Of Friendships,  1933
 Fiddler's Coin,  1934
 Folly Farm,  1934
 Low Bridge,  1935
 Strangers In The House,  1935
 Benefit Street,  1936
 Angels May Weep,  1937
 A Row Of Starts,  1937
 Singing Shadows,  1938
 To Have, To Keep,  1939
 Clo,  1940
 Lorrie,  1941
 Yours For The Asking,  1943
 Mary Patten's Daughters,  1945
 The Outsiders,  1948
 River's Rim,  1950
 The Neighbors,  1952
 The Inheritors,  1953
 The Open Way,  1955

References

External links
 The Inventory of the Jane Abbott Collection #630, Howard Gotlieb Archival Research Center, Boston University

1881 births
1962 deaths
Writers from Buffalo, New York
20th-century American women writers
Cornell University alumni